This article lists the vice presidents of Catalonia, the second most senior position in the Government of Catalonia. The position, previously known as First Minister, Chief Advisor, Chief Executive Officer and Head of the Executive Board, is optional and is appointed by the president of Catalonia.

List

References

 Vice President